Leptidea is a genus of butterflies of family Pieridae, the whites and yellows. They live in Europe and Asia.

The genus contains the following species: 
Leptidea amurensis Ménétriés, 1859 
Leptidea darvazensis Bolshakov, 2004 Central Asian mountains
Leptidea descimoni Mazel, 2004 Kyrgyzstan
Leptidea duponcheli (Staudinger, 1871) – eastern wood white – South Europe, Asia Minor, Balkans, Iran
Leptidea gigantea (Leech, 1890) China
Leptidea juvernica  – cryptic wood white 
Leptidea lactea Lorkovic, 1950  Tapaischan, China
Leptidea morsei Fenton, [1882]
Leptidea reali Reissinger, [1990] – Real's wood white
Leptidea serrata Lee, 1955 China
Leptidea sinapis (Linnaeus, 1758) – wood white
Leptidea yunnanica Koiwaya, 1996 China

References

External links
images representing Leptidea at Consortium for the Barcode of Life

 
Pieridae genera
Taxa named by Gustaf Johan Billberg
Dismorphiinae